Amarna Letter EA2 is the letter of the Amarna series of inscriptions designated EA2, which is inscribed with cuneiform writing showing the continuation of a correspondence between Kadašman-Enlil I and Amenḥotep III, from EA1. This letter is known to be concerning, A Proposal of Marriage. The letter is part of a series of correspondences from Babylonia to Egypt, which run from EA2 to EA4 and EA6 to EA14. EA1 and EA5 are from Egypt to Babylonia.  

The composition of the matter of the tablet onto which the letter is inscribed is clay taken from the Euphrates. 

Translations which exist which are made by Moran (1992) and Liverani (1999). 

Jean Nougayrol thought this letter to be a lettre d'envoi. 
The letter reads (as translated by William L. Moran):

See also
Chronology of the ancient Near East
Amarna letters: EA 1, EA 3, EA 4, EA 5, EA 6, EA 7, EA 8, EA 9, EA 10, EA 11

References

Amarna letters